Sanchita Bhattacharyaa or Guru Sanchita Bhattacharyaa is an Indian Odissi dancer. She specializes in classical Odissi dance.

Career
She has performed across India and abroad, including at New York's Madison Square Garden. She toured the US for charity funds. She was featured in a movie in the US. Its shooting is in progress.

The New York Times noted "her dance has been described as perfection". Odissi dancing dates back to the first and second century BC, and is one of India's oldest surviving dace forms.

Personal life 
She married Indian classical musician Tarun Bhattacharya.

Performances
Her performances include:

In India:
 Sanket Mochan Festival - Varanasi
 Dovar Lane Music Conference
 National Maritime Day Celebration in India, 2008
 Jagannath Temple Puri
 Opening Ceremony of 1st India International Woman Festival
 Indian Spring Fest

Abroad:
 25th Anniversary celebration of NABC at Madison Square Garden
 Esplanade Theatre - Singapore
 Grand Finale of India festival at North Carolina
 University of Minnesota - USA
 Hull Truck Theatre by kingston Government - UK

Recognition 

 Cultural Ambassador of India 

 Sangeet Shyamala Award 2011
 Rash Ratna Award 2011 by Hinduthan Art and Music Society
 Dovar Lane Music Conference Award 2008
 Cultural Ambassador of India
 Kolkata Gaurav Samman 2007 by Indian Press

Gallery

See also
Tarun Bhattacharya

References

External links

Indian female classical dancers
Performers of Indian classical dance
Odissi exponents
Living people
Year of birth missing (living people)